The College of Marin is a public community college in Marin County, California, with two campuses, one in Kentfield, and the second in Novato. It is the only institution operated by the Marin Community College District.

College of Marin has been in operation since 1926. Each semester, about 10,000 students are enrolled in over 1,100 credit classes. Approximately 100 international students participate in College of Marin's International Student Program. Nearly 6,000 students attend the college's community education and community services classes. College of Marin is known for its theatre department, which has the highest transfer acceptance to Juilliard of any two-year college in the nation.

History
The college offers seventy Associate of Arts and Associate of Science degree programs, and has established approximately 200 transfer agreements with the University of California, California State University, and private colleges. In addition, the college provides 35 two-year vocational and career programs, as well as providing basic skills, English as a second language education, and community education classes.

Originally known as Marin Junior College when established in 1926, the college was renamed College of Marin in 1947. In 1985 College of Marin merged with Indian Valley College. This merger provided Marin residents with two campuses, the original campus located in Kentfield and the Indian Valley Campus in Novato. The two campuses serve a county population of approximately 250,000 residents.

The Echo Times
The Echo Times is the college's monthly student-run newspaper.

Governance
The College of Marin is governed as part of the Marin Community College District (MCCD), the community college district serving Marin County, California. MCCD is one of six California community college districts that is considered "basic aid", or "self-supporting", and therefore receives most of its operating revenue from local property taxes rather than State apportionment (since local property tax revenues exceed apportionment figures).

The MCCD is governed by seven members of a board of trustees elected at-large to four-year terms. Elections are held every two years, three members chosen the year after a presidential election and four chosen the year before. The students also elect one non-voting student trustee, who serves a one-year term and can participate in discussions and make and second motions so long as they are not related to real estate negotiations, personnel or collective bargaining.

Athletics

Fall
Soccer (men's and women's)
Water Polo
Volleyball

Winter
Basketball (men's and women's)

Spring 
Baseball
Swimming and Diving
Track and Field
Football
Wrestling

Student body association
In 1927 the students of College of Marin organized an unincorporated association named "The Associated Students of Marin Junior College".  On October 8, 1932, they filed in the office of the California Secretary of State a document titled "Articles of Incorporation of The Associated Students of Marin Junior College".  The filing of that document transformed The Associated Students of Marin Junior College into a corporation.  On March 1, 1991, the students filed a "Certificate of Amendment of Articles of Incorporation".  The filing of that amendment changed the corporation's name to "Associated Students College of Marin".

California law provides that, "The governing board of each community college district shall establish, maintain, operate, and govern one or more community colleges". The Board of Trustees of Marin Community College District has authorized the students of the district to organize a "student body association". The district's governing board has recognized that Associated Students College of Marin is a student body association. The governing board has also recognized Associated Students College of Marin "as the official voice for the students in District decision-making processes".

The bylaws of Associated Students College of Marin (ASCOM) include a paragraph that reads, "The Associated Students of the College of Marin shall be associated with and a member of the Student Senate [for] California Community Colleges. The rules and regulations of the Student Senate [for] California Community Colleges shall be followed when consistent with the rules and regulations of ASCOM. Each new administration must approve and review the affiliation of the Associated Students of College of Marin with the Student Senate [for] California Community Colleges."

2021-2022 ASCOM BOARD

Notable alumni
 Robert Mailer Anderson, author, activist, and philanthropist
Jack Angel, voice actor
Don Barksdale, NBA Hall of Fame
Cabot Bigham, professional rallycross driver
 Terry Bozzio, musician, drummer (with Frank Zappa and UK)
 Pete Carroll, American football coach
 Konrad Dryden, author
 Dian Fossey (business classes, 1949–50), primate research
 David Haskell, actor
 Leslie Hendrix, actor
 Echo Heron, nursing, author (New York Times bestselling), activist
 Art Schallock, oldest living MLB player
 Honor Jackson, NFL player
 Doug Dressler, NFL player
 Naomi Judd, nursing, singer/songwriter
 Jim Kent, Research scientist and computer programmer
 Young L, rapper
 Erik Raven, United States Under Secretary of the Navy
 Adam Steltzner (1985–87), NASA engineer at JPL; phase lead and development manager for EDL (Entry, Descent and Landing) of the Curiosity rover lander, which successfully landed on Mars on August 5, 2012
 Scott Thunes (1976-78 music), musician, bassist for Frank Zappa
 Robin Williams (1970-1973 theatre), actor and comedian

References

External links 
 Official website
 Echo Times student newspaper website

 
Marin, College of
California Community Colleges
Universities and colleges in Marin County, California
Schools accredited by the Western Association of Schools and Colleges
1926 establishments in California